The Roman Catholic Diocese of Uíje is a diocese located in Uíje in the Ecclesiastical province of Malanje in Angola.

History
 March 14, 1967: Established as Diocese of Carmona and São Salvador from the Metropolitan Archdiocese of Luanda
 May 16, 1979: Renamed as Diocese of Uíje

Special churches
The Cathedral of the diocese is Sé Catedral de Nossa Senhora da Conceição (Cathedral Church of the Conception of Our Lady) in Uije .

Bishops

Ordinaries, in reverse chronological order
 Bishops of Uíje (Roman rite), below
 Bishop Joaquim Nhanganga Tyombe (February 2, 2021 - )
 Bishop Emilio Sumbelelo (February 2, 2008  – February 11, 2019), appointed Bishop of Viana
 Bishop José Francisco Moreira dos Santos, O.F.M. Cap. (May 16, 1979  – February 2, 2008), retired; see below
 Bishop of Carmona and São Salvador (Roman rite), below
 Bishop José Francisco Moreira dos Santos, O.F.M. Cap. (March 14, 1967  – May 16, 1979);  see above

Coadjutor bishop
Emílio Sumbelelo (2006-2008)

Other priests of this diocese who became bishops
Almeida Kanda (Canda), appointed Bishop of Ndalatando in 2005
Luzizila Kiala, appointed Bishop of Sumbe in 2013

See also
Roman Catholicism in Angola

References
 GCatholic.org

Uije
Christian organizations established in 1967
Roman Catholic dioceses and prelatures established in the 20th century
Uije, Roman Catholic Diocese of
Roman Catholic bishops of Uíje